Kurdeg is a village in the Kurdeg CD block in the Simdega subdivision of the Simdega district in the Indian state of Jharkhand.

Geography

Location
Kurdeg is located at

Area overview
In the area presented in the map alongside, “the landscape is formed of hills and undulating plateau” in the south-western part of the Chota Nagpur Plateau. About 32% of the district is covered with forests (mark the shaded portions in the map.) It is an overwhelmingly rural area with 92.83% of the population living in the rural areas.  A major portion of the rural population depends on rain-fed agriculture (average annual rainfall: 1,100-1,200 mm) for a living.

Note: The map alongside presents some of the notable locations in the district. All places marked in the map are linked in the larger full screen map.

Civic administration
There is a police station at Kurdeg. 
 
The headquarters of Kurdeg CD block are located at Kurdeg village.

Demographics
According to the 2011 Census of India, Kurdeg had a total population of 1,629, of which 805 (49%) were males and 824 (51%) were females. Population in the age range 0–6 years was 252. The total number of literate persons in Kurdeg was 952 (69.14% of the population over 6 years.

(*For language details see Kurdeg block#Language and religion)

Education
Government High School  Kurdeg is a Hindi-medium coeducational institution established in 1960. It  has facilities for teaching in class IX to class XII. The school has a playground and a library with 385 books.

Inter College Kurdeg is a Hindi-medium coeducational institution established in 1983. It has facilities for teaching in classes XI and XII. It has a playground.

Kasturba Gandhi Balika Vidyalaya is a Hindi-medium girls only institution established in 2011. It has facilities for teaching from class I to class XI. The school has a playground and a library with 58 books.

Healthcare
There is a Community Health Centre (Hospital) at Kurdeg.

References

Villages in Simdega district